The 1890 Philadelphia Phillies season was a season in Major League Baseball. The Phillies finished third in the National League.

Regular season

Season standings

Record vs. opponents

Roster

Player stats

Batting

Starters by position 
Note: Pos = Position; G = Games played; AB = At bats; H = Hits; Avg. = Batting average; 2B = Doubles; 3B = Triples; HR = Home runs; RBI = Runs batted in; SB = Stolen bases; BB = Walks; K = Strikeouts

Other batters 
Note: G = Games played; AB = At bats; H = Hits; Avg. = Batting average; 2B = Doubles; 3B = Triples; HR = Home runs; RBI = Runs batted in; SB = Stolen bases; BB = Walks; K = Strikeouts

Pitching

Starting pitchers 
Note: G = Games pitched; IP = Innings pitched; H = Hits; W = Wins; L = Losses; ERA = Earned run average; BB = Walks; SO = Strikeouts

Other pitchers 
Note: G = Games pitched; IP = Innings pitched; H = Hits; W = Wins; L = Losses; ERA = Earned run average; BB = Walks; SO = Strikeouts

References 
1890 Philadelphia Phillies season at Baseball Reference

Philadelphia Phillies seasons
Philadelphia Phillies season
Philadelphia Phillies